Cem Stamati (born January 21, 1981) is the bass guitar player of the Turkish band Sefarad. He was born in Istanbul and graduated in 1999 from the Jewish school in Istanbul, Ulus Özel Musevi Lisesi.

Discography
 Sefarad
 Sefarad II

See also
 Turkish pop music
 Music of Turkey
 List of Turkish pop music performers

External links
  Official site

1981 births
Living people
Musicians from Istanbul
Jewish musicians
Turkish Jews